Shelby Serhee Salvacion (born 6 February 1992) is a Filipino former women's international footballer who used to play for the Philippines women's national soccer team. Also played D1 soccer for 5 years at Sacramento State University. She graduated with a Bachelor of Science degree with a 4.0 gpa her senior year.

High school career
Salvacion attended Branham High School in San Jose, California where she played for the school's soccer team for four years and was a member of the school's track and field team as a senior. She was named part of the Second Team All-County by local news outfit The Mercury News. She was named as MVP of the Blossom Valley Athletic League, in which her school was a part of, after scoring 12 goals with eight assist. She was part of an all-league selection for her first two seasons and was named to the First Team all-BVAL honors in her junior year. She also played club soccer for MVLA Storm and won the 2008 and 2009 Pleasanton Rage Tournament with the club.

College career
Salvacion played for the Sacramento State Hornets, the women's soccer team of her college, California State University, Sacramento as a forward. She played from 2011 to 2015 although she was a redshirt during her freshman year in 2010.

International career
Salvacion became part of the Philippine national team in late 2012 after participating in a training camp in Southern California organized by then head coach Ernie Nierras.

was part of the squad that participated at the 2014 AFC Women's Asian Cup qualifiers in Bangladesh. She also received a call up to the Philippine national team for the 2013 Southeast Asian Games

She also played for the Philippines at the 2013 AFF Women's Championship and was called up again for the same tournament's 2016 edition.

References

1992 births
Living people
Filipino women's footballers
Philippines women's international footballers
Place of birth missing (living people)
Women's association football forwards
California State University, Sacramento alumni
Soccer players from San Jose, California